John Daniel Harty (born December 17, 1958) is a former American football defensive tackle. Harty was selected in the second round by the San Francisco 49ers out of the University of Iowa in the 1981 NFL Draft.

External links
NFL.com player page
Stats

1958 births
Living people
Sportspeople from Sioux City, Iowa
Players of American football from Iowa
American football defensive tackles
Iowa Hawkeyes football players
San Francisco 49ers players